Novoselivka is a village in Pokrovsk Raion (district) in Donetsk Oblast of eastern Ukraine, at about  north by east of the centre of Donetsk city. It belongs to Ocheretyne settlement hromada, one of the hromadas of Ukraine.

The settlement came under attack by Russian forces during the Russian invasion of Ukraine in 2022, and was regained by Ukrainian forces by the end of September the same year.

Demographics
The settlement had 541 inhabitants in 2001, language distribution as of the Ukrainian Census of the same year:
Ukrainian: 73.75%
Russian: 25.28%
Belarusian: 0.18%

References

Villages in Pokrovsk Raion